Roope Kinnunen is a Finnish rapper and record producer. He frequently uses stage names such as RPK, Koksukoo and RoopeK.

Career

Kinnunen started his career in various bands, such as Ceebrolistics and Serkkupojat.

He is best known for his work with a fellow rapper Eevil Stöö. Their first collaborative album together, Fuck Vivaldi, was released on 20 July 2012. The album peaked at number one on the Official Finnish Album Chart and was later nominated for an Emma Award in the category of the Best Hip Hop / Reggae / Urban Album of 2012.

Since 2010, Kinnunen has also collaborated in a number of releases with Julma-Henri, previously known for his group Julma-Henri & Syrjäytyneet. This collaboration culminated in the duo Eurocrack releasing Euro Crack EP in 2012 and the studio album Huume (stylized as H U U M E) which peaked at number seven on the Finnish Album Chart.

Selected discography

Albums and EPs
with Ceebrolistics
1998: A Day of the People in Between
2001: 0. EP
2005: Ö

as RPK
2010: Kutsu EP Julma-Henri & RPK
2011: "HENRI" Julma-Henri & RPK
2012: Euro Crack EP JLMA HNRI X RPK

as Koksu Koo

as Eurocrack (duo with Julma-Henri)

Singles
with Ceebrolistics
2000: "Hyviä juttuja / Me"
2004: "Aintie"

References

Living people
Finnish rappers
Finnish hip hop record producers
Year of birth missing (living people)